Vadnal Rajanna is an Indian Politician from the state of Karnataka. He is a two term member of the Karnataka Legislative Assembly.

Constituency
He represents the Channagiri constituency.

Political party
First he was from Bharatiya Janata Party and later joined the Indian National Congress.

References 

Living people
Indian National Congress politicians from Karnataka
Year of birth missing (living people)
Karnataka MLAs 1999–2004
Karnataka MLAs 2013–2018